Arotrolepis filicauda, is a filefish found in northern Western Australia, Northern Territory, Queensland, New South Wales, eastern Victoria, northern Tasmania, and southern Papua New Guinea, the sole member of its genus.

References

Monacanthidae
Monotypic marine fish genera
Taxa named by Alec Fraser-Brunner